Charleroi is a borough in Washington County, Pennsylvania, United States, along the Monongahela River, 21 miles south of Pittsburgh. Charleroi was settled by Walloons in 1890 and incorporated in 1891. The 2020 census recorded a population of 4,210.

There has been a large-scale cessation of industrial activities in the region. The decrease in the population is associated with the decline of regional heavy and medium industries, especially the steel-making industry, all once fed by the cheap transportation on the Monongahela River which extends from upstream of Charleroi well into northern West Virginia and north & downstream past McKeesport to the mouth of the Monongahela at Pittsburgh. Colloquially, the stretch from Charleroi north to McKeesport (historically because of press coverage of High School sports leagues), is known as the "Mon Valley"; or by some speakers (politicians, reporters and weathermen), the school-league-term has long been extended to mean from the river mouth to northern West Virginia. Once dubbed "Magic City", Charleroi has in recent years seen a gradual revitalization of its business district.

History 

Charleroi got its name from the Belgian city of Charleroi. There lived many Belgian immigrants in the Monongahela area at the end of the 19th century, some of whom were glass makers.

The Pittsburgh Plate Glass Company, today PPG Industries, had one of its major factories located at the current chamber plaza, at one point employing up to a thousand employees, making it one of the largest glass factories in the world at the time. For years it was the home to one of Corning Glass Companies leading employers. Today it is home to Corelle Brands, which makes Pyrex. In celebration of the 100th anniversary of Pyrex products, Charleroi renamed itself "Pyrex, PA" for 100 days in 2015.

Charleroi was home to one of the first movie theatres in the nation, the Electric Theatre at 520 McKean Avenue, which opened in October 1905 and has since been demolished. The Charleroi Historic District, First National Bank of Charleroi and United States Post Office are listed on the National Register of Historic Places.

In 2020, Paul Magnette, mayor of Charleroi (Belgium) visited the town that was founded by migrants from his city.

Geography
Charleroi is located at  (40.138088, -79.901333). The total area is 10.47% water.

Surrounding and adjacent neighborhoods
Charleroi has four land borders, including North Charleroi to the north, Speers to the southwest, Twilight to the south, and Carroll Township to the west.  Across the Monongahela River to the east, Charleroi runs adjacent with Rostraver Township in Westmoreland County.

Demographics

As of the census of 2000, there were 4,871 people, 2,258 households, and 1,208 families residing in the borough. The population density was 6,308.6 people per square mile (2,442.5/km2). There were 2,656 housing units at an average density of 3,439.9 per square mile (1,331.8/km2). The racial makeup of the borough was 95.3% White, 3.2% African American, 0.1% Native American, 0.3% Asian, 0.2% from other races, and 0.8% from two or more races. Hispanic or Latino of any race were 0.7% of the population.

There were 2,258 households, out of which 22.3% had children under the age of 18 living with them, 35.5% were married couples living together, 13.37% had a female householder with no husband present, and 46.5% were non-families. 41.8% of all households were made up of individuals, and 21.9% had someone living alone who was 65 years of age or older. The average household size was 2.11 and the average family size was 2.88.

In the borough the population was spread out, with 20.5% under the age of 18, 7.1% from 18 to 24, 27.1% from 25 to 44, 20.2% from 45 to 64, and 25.0% who were 65 years of age or older. The median age was 41 years. For every 100 females, there were 81.4 males. For every 100 females age 18 and over, there were 77.1 males.

The median income for a household in the borough was $23,593, and the median income for a family was $31,699. Males had a median income of $30,093 versus $23,873 for females. The per capita income for the borough was $13,752. About 16.1% of families and 21.3% of the population were below the poverty line, including 36.2% of those under age 18 and 13.7% of those age 65 or over.

In popular culture 
 A large part of the plot of the alternate history novel The Two Georges, by Harry Turtledove and Richard Dreyfuss, takes place in Charleroi, Pennsylvania. In the alternate history of this book, North America remains part of the British Empire. Charleroi is described as a large coal-mining town filled with embittered coal miners of mainly Irish descent living under conditions of poverty, exploitation and pollution, who end up supporting radical underground political movements.
 Charleroi and the surrounding area are the setting for American Rust, a 2009 novel by Philipp Meyer.

Notable people
 Keith Ackerman (1946- ), a bishop and former rector of St. Mary's Church
 Barbara Bosson (1939-2023), actress, movies, and television, Multiple Emmy Award nominations
 Anne Feeney (1951-2021), a political activist, folk musician and singer-songwriter.
 Shirley Jones (1934- ), singer, actress on Broadway, movies, and television
 Robert Karvelas (1921-1991), American actor born in New York City, but raised in Charleroi
 Lisa Kirk (1925-1990), singer, actress
 Craig McCracken (1971- ), animator, director, producer
 Demi Moore (1962- ), actress; lived in Charleroi for less than a year
 Mitchell Paige (Serbian: Mihajlo Pejic) (1918-2003), WW2 Medal of Honor recipient
 Myron Pottios (1939- ), professional football player, All American at Notre Dame 1959
 Olive Thomas (1894-1920), Ziegfeld girl, Vargas girl, actress, wife of Jack Pickford

See also
Rogers Manor, Pennsylvania

References

External links
 Official  Borough of Charleroi website
 Official Charleroi Area High School website

Boroughs in Washington County, Pennsylvania
Pennsylvania populated places on the Monongahela River
Pittsburgh metropolitan area
Populated places established in 1890
1890 establishments in Pennsylvania